{{Infobox settlement
|official_name            = Catonsville, Maryland
|settlement_type          = Census-designated place
|image_skyline            = Catonsville Frederick Road.jpg
|imagesize                = 
|image_caption            = Frederick Road in Downtown Catonsville.
|image_flag               = 
|image_seal               = 

|nicknames                = "Music City, Maryland", "Cville", "The Ville"
|motto                    = "Life is great in 21228"

|image_map = Baltimore_County_Maryland_Incorporated_and_Unincorporated_areas_Catonsville_Highlighted.svg
|mapsize                  = 250px
|map_caption              = Location of Catonsville, Maryland
|image_map1               = 
|mapsize1                 = 
|map_caption1             = 

|coordinates              = 
|subdivision_type         = Country
|subdivision_name         = 
|subdivision_type1        = State
|subdivision_name1        = 
|subdivision_type2        = County
|subdivision_name2        =  Baltimore
|established_title        = Established
|established_date         = January 20, 1831

|government_footnotes     = 
|government_type          = 
|leader_title             = 
|leader_name              = 
|leader_title1            = 
|leader_name1             = 
|unit_pref  = Imperial
|area_footnotes           = 
|area_magnitude           = 
|area_total_km2           = 36.37
|area_total_sq_mi         = 14.04
|area_land_km2            = 36.16
|area_land_sq_mi          = 13.96
|area_water_km2           = 0.21
|area_water_sq_mi         = 0.08

|elevation_footnotes      = 
|elevation_m              = 146
|elevation_ft             = 479
|population_total         = 44701
|population_as_of         = 2020
|population_footnotes     = 
|population_density_km2   = 1236.22
|population_density_sq_mi = 3201.85

|postal_code_type         = ZIP codes
|postal_code              = 21228, 21229, 21250
|area_code                = 410, 443, and 667
|website                  = 
|footnotes                = 
|timezone                 = Eastern (EST)
|utc_offset = −5
|timezone_DST             = EDT
|utc_offset_DST = −4
|blank_name               = FIPS code
|blank_info               = 24-14125
|blank1_name              = GNIS feature ID
|blank1_info              = 0583624
|pop_est_as_of = 
|pop_est_footnotes = 
|population_est = 
}}
Catonsville  is a census-designated place (CDP) in Baltimore County, Maryland. The population was 41,567 at the 2010 census. The community lies to the west of Baltimore along the city's border. Catonsville contains the majority of the University of Maryland, Baltimore County (UMBC), a major public research university with close to 14,000 students.

History
Before European colonists settled in present-day Catonsville, the area was occupied by the Piscataway tribe or the Susquehannocks.

Rolling Road was used to transport tobacco south from plantations to the Patapsco River on horse-drawn wagons.

In 1787, the Ellicott family built the Frederick Turnpike to transport goods from their flour mill, Ellicott Mills, to the Baltimore harbor. Charles Carroll, the last surviving signer of the Declaration of Independence at the time, owned the land around the then newly built road. He instructed his son-in-law, Richard Caton, to develop the area along the road. Caton and his wife, Mary Carroll Caton, lived in Castle Thunder, constructed on the Frederick Turnpike in 1787.

Caton gave his name to the community and called it "Catonville," although the name was changed to "Catonsville" in the 1830s. Businesses were built along the Frederick Turnpike for travelers traveling from Ellicott City to Baltimore. Catonsville served as a layover stop for travelers and the town increasingly grew and developed. The pleasant surroundings attracted wealthy Baltimore merchants who built large Victorian and colonial summer homes there to escape Baltimore's summer heat.
Starting in 1862, horsecar services connected Catonsville to Baltimore. In 1884, the Catonsville Short Line railroad was built, providing 8 roundtrip trains to Baltimore daily. This allowed residents to commute to work in Baltimore. Commuter traffic exploded in the 1890s with the construction of electric streetcar lines and fancy housing developments. Catonsville had become one of the first commuter suburbs in the United States. Baltimore has tried to annex Catonsville, although their attempts have all been failures. The last attempt was in 1918.

Homes of all sizes were constructed rapidly through the 1970s, when much of land around the Frederick Turnpike had been converted into housing. A new and modern business district opened along the newly built Baltimore National Pike, north from the Frederick Turnpike.

Catonsville was briefly made famous during the 1968 protest by the "Catonsville Nine", during which draft records were burned by Catholic anti-war activists.

In 2002, the Maryland legislature issued a proclamation declaring Catonsville to be "Music City, Maryland", because of the concentration of musical retail stores, venues and educational facilities in the area. Life Sounds Great is a series of compilation albums highlighting Catonsville musicians.

In 2007, Money magazine ranked Catonsville the 49th best place to live in the United States and the third best in Maryland and Virginia.

Geography
Catonsville is located at  (39.273756, −76.738012).

Catonsville is centered along Frederick Road (Maryland Route 144), once the main road from Baltimore leading to points west replacing what is now called Old Frederick Road. Johnnycake Road and Academy Road form the northern and northeastern boundaries of Catonsville, the Patapsco River provides the western and southern boundaries, Gun Road, Shelbourne Road Linden Avenue, Circle Drive and Wilkens Avenue form the southeastern boundaries while Baltimore City forms the eastern boundary. Catonsville is bordered by Woodlawn to the north, Baltimore to the east, by Arbutus to the southeast, by Ilchester to the southwest, and by Ellicott City to the west.

In addition to Frederick Road (Exit 13), Interstate 695 (the Baltimore Beltway) services Wilkens Avenue (Maryland Route 372), Edmondson Avenue and the Baltimore National Pike (U.S. Route 40) via Exits 12, 14 and 15, respectively, with the latter two thoroughfares later converging in Baltimore City to the east. The main north–south roads in the area are Rolling Road (which is also Maryland Route 166 south of Frederick Road), Ingleside Avenue and Bloomsbury Avenue.

Catonsville is a terminus of the Trolley Line Number 9 Trail and the Short Line Railroad Trail.

Transportation
Public transit
The Maryland Transit Administration provides bus service to the Catonsville area via the Purple CityLink route with service to Downtown Baltimore, LocalLink routes 37 and 77, and Express BusLink 150 to Columbia. MARC Train provides commuter train service at the nearby Halethorpe station in Arbutus.

Roads
Major north–south routes in Catonsville include: 
 Interstate 695 (Baltimore Beltway) traveling south to north from Glen Burnie to Towson.
 Interstate 195 (Metropolitan Boulevard) traveling east to west from southern Catonsville to BWI Airport.
 Maryland Route 166 (S. Rolling Road) traveling north to south from Frederick Road to Relay. North Rolling Road continues north of Frederick Road to Old Court Road in Randallstown.

Major east–west routes in Catonsville include:
 Interstate 70 traveling east to west from Security Boulevard-Cooks Lane to Frederick.
 U.S. Route 40 (Baltimore National Pike) east to west from Baltimore to Ellicott City.
 Maryland Route 144 (Frederick Road) traveling east to west from Irvington to Ellicott City.
 Maryland Route 372 (Wilkens Avenue) traveling east to west from Southwestern Boulevard to Rolling Road.

Neighborhoods
Academy Heights, a residential community surrounding Mount de Sales Academy.
College Hills, a newer residential community surrounding the Community College of Baltimore County and the University of Maryland, Baltimore County.
Colonial Gardens, a residential neighborhood along Edmondson Avenue.
Ingleside, home to Ingleside Shopping Center on Baltimore National Pike.
Paradise, located east of Downtown Catonsville.
Summit Park, located northwest above Frederick Road adjacent to the Baltimore County Public Library
Westchester, located at the crossroads of Westchester and Rockwell Avenues.
Western Hills, located north of Downtown Catonsville along North Rolling Road.
Westview Park, located north of Downtown Catonsville along Baltimore National Pike.
Winters Lane, bordered to the north by Route 40, to the south by Edmondson Avenue, to the east by Beltway and to the west by Rolling Road, an Historically African-American residential neighborhood
Woodbridge Valley, located north of Downtown Catonsville along North Rolling Road, north of Baltimore National Pike.
Oak Forest Park, located west of Downtown Catonsville.
Arden Parke, a small residential area owned by Richmond American Homes.
Windwood, residential neighborhood south of Frederick Road and directly west of Oak Forest Park

Demographics

In 2010 Catonsville had a population of 41,567.  The ethnic and racial composition of the population was 73.4% non-Hispanic white, 14.3% non-Hispanic black, 0.3% Native American, 6.3% Asian, 0.1% Pacific Islander, 0.2% non-Hispanic from some other race, 2.4% from two or more races and 3.4% Hispanic or Latino from any race.

As of the census of 2000, there were 39,820 people, 15,503 households, and 9,255 families residing in the CDP. The racial makeup of the CDP was 82.28% White, 11.83% African American, 0.22% Native American, 3.61% Asian, 0.04% Pacific Islander, 0.59% from other races, and 1.43% from two or more races. Hispanic or Latino of any race were 1.87% of the population.

There were 15,503 households, out of which 25.7% had children under the age of 18 living with them, 46.7% were married couples living together, 9.9% had a female householder with no husband present, and 40.3% were non-families. 33.8% of all households were made up of individuals, and 17.4% had someone living alone who was 65 years of age or older. The average household size was 2.30 and the average family size was 2.98.

In the CDP, the population was spread out, with 19.9% under the age of 18, 12.0% from 18 to 24, 27.2% from 25 to 44, 20.7% from 45 to 64, and 20.2% who were 65 years of age or older. The median age was 39 years. For every 100 females, there were 86.0 males. For every 100 females age 18 and over, there were 81.9 males.

The median income for a household in the CDP was $53,061, and the median income for a family was $67,005. Males had a median income of $44,705 versus $33,420 for females. The per capita income for the CDP was $25,254. About 2.8% of families and 4.6% of the population were below the poverty line, including 3.3% of those under age 18 and 4.1% of those age 65 or over.  The median house value for the CDP was $141,300 in the 2000.

Education
Primary and secondary education
Public schools

Residents are zoned to schools in the Baltimore County Public Schools. Catonsville High School, Woodlawn Senior High School (center for science and pre engineering), and Western School of Technology and Environmental Science, formerly Western Vocational Technical Center, serve the area.

Private schools
Mount de Sales Academy is a Catholic all-girls high school in Catonsville.
 Saint Mark School and Parish can be found in Catonsville on Melvin Avenue, just off of Frederick Road.
 Al-Rahmah School is an Islamic school on Johnnycake Road in northern Catonsville

Higher education
The University of Maryland, Baltimore County (UMBC) is located in Catonsville. 
The Community College of Baltimore County, formerly known as Catonsville Community College, has a campus in Catonsville across the street from Catonsville High School.

Attractions
Arts and entertainment

Earl and Darielle Linehan Concert Hall
Lurman Woodland Theatre
Retriever Activities Center

Museums

Benjamin Banneker Museum
Center for Art, Design and Visual Culture at the University of Maryland, Baltimore County
Spring Grove Hospital Center Alumni Museum

Parks and recreation

Catonsville Community Park
Conservation and Environmental Research Areas of UMBC
George F.Bragg Nature Study Center and Horticulture Center
Gliston Park
Joseph Beuys Sculpture Park
Benjamin Banneker Historical Park
Patapsco Valley State Park
Short Line Railroad Trail
Trolley Line Number 9 Trail
Western Hills Community Park (Crosby Park)
Westview Recreation Area

U.S. National Register of Historic Places
Hilton (Catonsville, Maryland)
Winters Lane Historic District

Natives and residents of note
Benjamin Banneker, African-American inventor, scientist and mathematician
Daniel Berrigan and Philip Berrigan, peace activists
John Wilkes Booth, actor; assassin of President Abraham Lincoln, attended St. Timothy's Hall, an Episcopal military academy in Catonsville, age 13–14
William Henry Gorman, businessman who lived in Oak Forest Park from 1897 to 1915
Charles S. Roberts, known as "The Father of Wargaming"
James Cardinal Stafford, an American cardinal of the Catholic Church who served as Major Penitentiary of the Apostolic Penitentiary, President of the Pontifical Council for the Laity, Archbishop of Denver, Bishop of Memphis, and Auxiliary Bishop of Baltimore

Arts and media
Nan Agle, children's book author
Louis S. Diggs, Baltimore County historian
Duff Goldman, star of Food Network's Ace of Cakes'', and owner of Charm City Cakes attended University of Maryland Baltimore County 
David Hasselhoff, actor
Emily Spencer Hayden, photographer
Elaine Hamilton, abstract expressionist painter
Mimi Dietrich, author of quilting books and member of Quilters Hall of Fame
Juliana Luecking, recording artist and filmmaker
Shelley Puhak, poet 
Kathleen Turner, actor
Steve Yeager, filmmaker

Music
John Christ, guitarist for the band Danzig
Greg Kihn, rock musician
Pat DeMent, lead guitarist for Kix, SR-71, and Cinder Road
Bill Frisell, jazz guitarist
Ric Ocasek, lead singer of 1980s band The Cars
Andy Stack (musician), drummer and keyboardist for the band Wye Oak
Thomas Viloteau, French classical guitarist

Sports
Ken Dixon, former pitcher, Baltimore Orioles
Brian Jozwiak, former West Virginia University lineman, and former professional football player for the National Football League's Kansas City Chiefs
Adam Kolarek, professional baseball pitcher, Tampa Bay Rays, LA Dodgers, 2020 World Series Champion
Charlie Maisel, former Major League Baseball player, St. Louis Browns
Fritz Maisel, known as the "Catonsville Flash," former Major League Baseball player, of the New York Highlanders, now known as the New York Yankees
George Maisel, former Major League Baseball player, Baltimore Terrapins
Don Matthews, professional football coach, Canadian Football League, Baltimore Stallions
John Miller, former pitcher, Baltimore Orioles
Jeff Nelson, former major league baseball pitcher
Jalen Robinson, professional soccer player

Sports teams 
Chesapeake Bayhawks, former professional men's lacrosse team
Baltimore Tribe, former professional lacrosse team
Maryland Bays, former professional soccer team
UMBC Retrievers, collegiate athletic division for the University of Maryland, Baltimore County
Spring Grove Baseball Club semi-professional baseball team

References

External links

Catonsville Historical Society
Greater Catonsville Chamber of Commerce
Story Behind a 1925 Catonsville Home - Ghosts of Baltimore blog

William C. Kerr papers at the University of Maryland Libraries

 
Census-designated places in Baltimore County, Maryland
Census-designated places in Maryland